Viluppuram Taluk is a taluk of Viluppuram district of the Indian state of Tamil Nadu. The headquarters of the taluk is the town of Viluppuram.

Demographics
According to the 2011 census, the taluk of Viluppuram had a population of 715,411 with 358,721  males and 356,690 females. There were 994 women for every 1,000 men. The taluk had a literacy rate of 69.6%. Child population in the age group below 6, was 38,979 Males and 37,052 Females.

References 

Taluks of Villupuram district